

The SME Aero Tiga, originally the Dätwyler MD-3 Swiss Trainer is a trainer aircraft developed in Switzerland through the 1960s and 70s, and which first flew in 1983.

Design and development
In configuration, the Swiss Trainer is a mid-wing, cantilever monoplane with fixed spatted tricycle undercarriage. Accommodation for the pilot and instructor was provided as side-by-side seats under an expansive bubble canopy.  The four-cylinder horizontally-opposed piston engine drove a fixed two-blade propeller.

While the layout of the aircraft was entirely orthodox, its construction was not, as the Swiss Trainer was designed to be as modular as possible to lower the cost and complexity of production and maintenance. To this end, as many parts were made interchangeable as possible. For example, all nine control surfaces (two ailerons, four flap segments, two elevators, and the rudder) are the same part that can be fitted to any of these locations with minimal modification. Both halves of the horizontal stabiliser and the fin can similarly be interchanged, and most of the left and right wings is common to both. The aircraft features an unusual exhaust that spans the entire length of the underside of the fuselage. Entry is through a forward sliding canopy that also includes the wing root fairing.

In 1993, all rights to the design were acquired by SME Aerospace of Malaysia, who began to produce it as the Aero Tiga shortly thereafter, having received orders for 20 by the Royal Malaysian Air Force. The first two of these were delivered in 1995, and the order was increased to 60 aircraft the following year. SME Aerospace also received orders for 20 aircraft for the Indonesian government's flight training center at Curug, as part of a deal by the Malaysian government to acquire IPTN CN-235 transports.

Operators

 Indonesian Civil Aviation Institute (id) – 20 in service

 Royal Malaysian Air Force – 20 (retired)

Specifications (MD3-160 AeroTiga)

See also

References

 
 
 

 
 
 
 
 
 
 

1980s Swiss civil trainer aircraft
Single-engined tractor aircraft
Mid-wing aircraft